Carol is a 2015 British-American romantic drama film directed by Todd Haynes. The screenplay, written by Phyllis Nagy, is based on Patricia Highsmith's 1952 romance novel The Price of Salt. The film stars Cate Blanchett and Rooney Mara as Carol Aird and Therese Belivet, two women from different classes and backgrounds embarking on a lesbian relationship in early 1950s New York City. Sarah Paulson, Kyle Chandler, and Jake Lacy feature in supporting roles. Carol premiered in May at the 2015 Cannes Film Festival, where it won the Queer Palm and Mara tied for the Best Actress award. It received a platform release in the United States, opening in four theaters on November 20, 2015 and going into wide release on January 15, 2016. Its $62,037 per theater average was the third-highest opening average of the year and the best opening weekend of Haynes' films. The film earned $43 million at worldwide box office on a production budget of $11.8 million.

Carol received positive reviews, particularly for Haynes' direction, Blanchett and Mara's performances, Edward Lachman's cinematography, Carter Burwell score, and Sandy Powell's costumes. Review aggregator Rotten Tomatoes surveyed 318 reviews and judged 94% of them to be positive. Metacritic calculated a weighted average score of 94/100 based on 45 reviews, indicating "universal acclaim". Carol was Metacritic's best-reviewed film of 2015, and Rotten Tomatoes' best-reviewed romance film of the year.

In 2016, the British Film Institute named Carol the best LGBT film of all time, as voted by more than 100 film experts, including critics, filmmakers, curators, academics, and programmers, in a poll encompassing over 80 years of cinema. Also in 2016, the British Broadcasting Corporation (BBC) ranked Carol Number 69 of the best 100 films since the year 2000, as voted by 177 film critics from 36 countries.

Carol received over 290 industry and critics nominations and over 100 awards and accolades. The American Film Institute selected it as one of its ten Movies of the Year. The film received six Academy Award nominations, including Best Actress, Best Supporting Actress, Best Cinematography, and Best Adapted Screenplay. It led the Golden Globe Award nominations with five, for Best Motion Picture – Drama, Best Actress for Blanchett and Mara, Best Director, and Best Original Score. Carol tied for the most nominations by the BAFTA Awards, garnering nine, among them Best Film, Best Direction, Best Actress in a Leading Role, Best Actress in a Supporting Role, and Best Adapted Screenplay. The film was nominated for six Independent Spirit Awards, including Best Feature, Best Director, Best Screenplay, Best Female Lead for Blanchett and Mara, and Best Cinematography, winning for Best Cinematography. The film received five AACTA International Awards nominations, winning Best Actress and Best Supporting Actress for Blanchett and Mara. Blanchett and Mara also received Screen Actors Guild Award nominations for Outstanding Performance by a Female Actor in a Leading Role and Outstanding Performance by a Female Actor in a Supporting Role, respectively.

Carol won the Audience Award at the Whistler Film Festival, and the Chicago International Film Festival's Gold Q Hugo Award for exhibiting "new artistic perspectives on sexuality and identity". Lachman was awarded the grand prize for Best Cinematography by the Camerimage International Film Festival, and the London Film Critics' Circle Technical Achievement Award. The National Society of Film Critics and Boston Society of Film Critics awarded Haynes and Lachman Best Director and Best Cinematography. The New York Film Critics Circle awarded Carol Best Film, Best Director, Best Screenplay, and Best Cinematography, and the film won Best Music from the Los Angeles Film Critics Association. The film also received nine nominations from the Broadcast Film Critics Association, including Best Film, Best Director, Best Actress and Best Supporting Actress. Carol was named the Best International Literary Adaptation by the Frankfurt Book Fair.

Accolades

Notes

See also
 2015 in film

References

External links 
 

Lists of accolades by film